John Lane Bell  (born March 25, 1945) is an Anglo-Canadian philosopher, mathematician and logician. He is Professor Emeritus of Philosophy at the University of Western Ontario in Canada.  His research includes such topics as set theory, model theory, lattice theory, modal logic, quantum logic, constructive mathematics, type theory, topos theory, infinitesimal analysis, spacetime theory, and the philosophy of mathematics. He is the author of more than 70 articles and of 13 books. In 2009, he was elected a Fellow of the Royal Society of Canada.

Biography
John Bell was awarded a scholarship to Oxford University at the age of 15, and graduated with a D.Phil. in Mathematics: his dissertation supervisor was John Crossley. During 1968–89 he was Lecturer in Mathematics and Reader in Mathematical Logic at the London School of Economics.

Bell's students include Graham Priest (Ph.D. Mathematics LSE, 1972), Michael Hallett (Ph.D. Philosophy LSE, 1979), David DeVidi (Ph.D. Philosophy UWO, 1994), Elaine Landry (Ph.D. Philosophy UWO, 1997) and Richard Feist (Ph.D. Philosophy UWO, 1999).

Bibliography
The Continuous, the Discrete, and the Infinitesimal in Philosophy and Mathematics  (New and Revised Edition of 2005 book), Springer, 2019.
Oppositions and Paradoxes: Philosophical Perplexities in Science and Mathematics. Broadview Press, 2016.
Intuitionistic Set Theory. College Publications, 2013.
Set Theory: Boolean-Valued Models and Independence Proofs. Oxford University Press 2011.
The Axiom of Choice. College Publications, 2009.
The Continuous and the Infinitesimal in Mathematics and Philosophy. Polimetrica, 2005.
(With D. DeVidi and G. Solomon) Logical Options: An Introduction to Classical and Alternative Logics. Broadview Press, 2001.
The Art of the Intelligible: An Elementary Survey of Mathematics in its Conceptual Development. Kluwer, 1999.
A Primer of Infinitesimal Analysis. Cambridge University Press, 1998. Second Edition, 2008.
Toposes & Local Set Theories: An Introduction. Clarendon Press,  Oxford, 1988. Reprinted by Dover, 2008. 
Boolean-Valued Models and Independence Proofs in Set Theory. Clarendon Press, Oxford, 1977. 2nd edition, 1985. 3rd edition, 2005.
(With M. Machover). A Course in Mathematical Logic. North-Holland, Amsterdam, 1977. 4th printing, 2003.
(With A. B. Slomson). Models and Ultraproducts: An Introduction. North-Holland, Amsterdam, 1969. Reprinted by Dover, 2006.

References

External links
John Bell's webpage
John Bell at the Mathematics Genealogy Project

1945 births
20th-century Canadian mathematicians
20th-century Canadian philosophers
21st-century Canadian mathematicians
21st-century Canadian philosophers
Academics of the London School of Economics
Alumni of the University of Oxford
Fellows of the Royal Society of Canada
Living people
Academic staff of the National University of Singapore
Model theorists
Philosophers of mathematics
Set theorists
Academic staff of the University of Western Ontario